Aruna Irani (born 3 May 1946) is an Indian actress, who has acted in over 500 films throughout Hindi, Kannada, Marathi and Gujarati cinema, playing mostly supporting and character roles. She has won two Filmfare Awards for Best Supporting Actress, for Pet Pyaar Aur Paap (1985) and Beta (1992), and has been nominated for most times, holding a record for the most nominations in the category. In January 2012, Irani was honoured with the Filmfare Lifetime Achievement Award at the 57th Filmfare Awards.

Early life

Aruna Irani was born in Mumbai, India to an Irani father and a Hindu mother. Her father Faredun Irani ran a drama troupe, and her mother Saguna was an actress. She is the eldest of eight siblings, and gave up studies after sixth standard because her family did not have enough money to educate all the children. She claims to have learnt dancing while working in the films because she could not afford professional training from a master. Her brothers Indra Kumar, Adi Irani and Firoz Irani are all associated with the film industry. Actress Bindu is her cousin.

Career

Aruna Irani made her debut in the film Gunga Jumna (1961) playing Azra's childhood character. She then acted in the film Anpadh (1962) as Mala Sinha's childhood character. She next did several small roles in films such as Jahanara (1964), Farz (1967), Upkar (1967) and Aaya Sawan Jhoomke (1969). She later acted with comedian Mehmood Ali in films such as Aulad (1968), Humjoli (1970), Devi (1970) and Naya Zamana (1971).

In 1971, she starred in Caravan. She later starred in Mehmood Ali's Bombay To Goa (1972), Garam Masala (1972) and Do Phool (1973). Her films have included Farz (1967), Bobby (1973), Fakira (1976), Sargam (1979), Red Rose (1980), Love Story (1981), and Rocky (1981).

She won her first Filmfare Best Supporting Actress Award for Pet Pyaar Aur Paap (1984).

In the late 1980s and 1990s Irani switched to playing motherly roles, notably in Beta (1992), for which she won her second Filmfare Best Supporting Actress Award. She acted in the Kannada remake of the same film with the same role. Some of her Marathi films are Aandhla Marto Dola, Bhingari, Changu Mangu, Lapwa Chapvi, Ek Gadi Baki Anadi, Mitwaa and Bol Baby Bol.

In her later career, Irani also switched to television, performing character roles in various serials. She also took up direction and production of tele-serials such as Mehndi Tere Naam Ki, Des Mein Niklla Hoga Chand, Rabba Ishq Na Hove, Vaidehi and more.

On 19 February 2012, she was awarded the 'Lifetime Achievement Award' at the annual Filmfare awards function in Mumbai.

Personal life

She is married to Bollywood film director Kuku Kohli.

Filmography 

 Gungi Ladki (1961)
 Jahanara (1964)
 Ganga Ki Lahren (1964)
 Kalapi (1966)
 Spy in Goa (1966) as Lilli
 Farz (1967)
 Patthar Ke Sanam (1967)
 Upkar (1967)
 Anokhi Raat (1968)
 Aulad (1968)
 Tumse Accha Kaun Hai (1969)
 Aya Sawan Jhoom Ke (1969)
 Anjaan Hai Koi (1969)
 Oos Raat Ke Baad (1969)
 Samay Bada Balwan (1969)
 Humjoli (1970)
 Aan Milo Sajna (1970)
 Safar (1970)
 The Train (1970)
 Naya Zamana (1971)
 Man Mandir (1971)
 Ek Paheli (1971)
 Johar Mehmood in Hong Kong (1971)
 Ek Naari Ek Brahmchari (1971)
 Caravan (1971) as Nisha
 Buddha Mil Gaya (1971)
 Andaz (1971)
 Sanjog (1971)
 Garam Masala (1972)
 Bombay to Goa (1972)
 Bobby (1973)
 Do Phool (1973)
 Prem Nagar (1974)
 Roti Kapda Aur Makaan (1974)
 Har Har Mahadev (1974)
 Mili (1975)
 Do Jasoos (1975)
 Dharam Jeet (1975) double role in a Punjabi movie
 Khel Khel Mein (1975)
 Ranga Khush (1975)
 Deewaar (1975) (uncredited)
 Santo Banto (1976) as Santo/ Banto double role in Punjabi movie
 Sankoch (1976)
 Bhanwar (1976)
 Charas (1976)
 Sangram (1976)
 Fakira (1976)
 Zindagi (1976) as Sudha N. Shukla
 Laila Majnu (1976)
 Rangaa Aur Raja (1977)
 Apnapan (1977)
 Duniyadaari (1977)
 Do Chehere (1977)
 Khoon Pasina (1977)
 Shalimar (1978)
 Khoon Ki Pukaar (1978)
 Gol Maal (1979)
 Jaani Dushman (1979)
 Kartavya (1979) as Lachhi
 Surakshaa (1979) as Ruby
 Beqasoor (1980 film)
 Karz (1980)
 Kali Ghata (1980) as Pinky
 Morcha (1980)
 Qurbani (1980)
 Judaai (1980) as Miss Lily, dancer
 Phir Wohi Raat (1980) as Shobha
 Hum Paanch (1980) as Nishi
 Jwalamukhi (1980 film)
 Kaaran (1981)
 Aas Paas (1981)
 Commander (1981)
 Rocky (1981)
 Jyoti (1981)
 Love Story (1981)
 Thee (1981) (Tamil film)
 Yaarana (1981)
 Kudrat (1981)
 Ammakkorumma (1981)
 Lawaaris (1981)
 Angoor (1982)
 Bemisal (1982)
 Brij Bhoomi (1982)
 Ek Din Bahu Ka (1983)
 Bade Dil Wala (1983)
 Thai Veedu (1983) (Tamil film)
 Jhutha Sach
 Mawali (1983)
 Pet Pyaar Aur Paap (1984)
 Ghar Ek Mandir (1984)
Paththar (1985)
Masterji (1985)
Patthar Dil (1985)
 Bhago Bhut Aaya (1985) as Nirmala / Manorama
Aaj Ka Daur (1985)
Piya Ke Gaon (1985)
 Dikri Chaali Sasariye (1985)
 Lallu Ram (1985) as Champa
 Naache Mayuri (1986)
 Insaniyat Ke Dushman (1987)
 Dayavan (1988)
 Ek Gadi Baaki Anadi (1988)
 Janam Janam (1988)
 Mera Muqaddar (1988) as Shanti
 Mere Baad (1988)
 Inteqam (1988)
 Bees Saal Baad (1988)
 Zulm Ko Jala Doonga (1988)
 Shahenshah (1988)
 Chaalbaaz (1989)
 Changu Mangu (1990)
 Majboor (1990)
 Doodh Ka Karz Hindi and Marathi (1990)
 Bandh Darwaza (1990) Mahua Daayan Kunka
 Jungle Love (1990)
 Brahmarshi Vishwamitra (1991)
 Phool Aur Kaante (1991)
 Shanti Kranti (1991)
 Lambu Dada (1992)
 Beta (1992)
 Umar 55 Ki Dil Bachpan Ka (1992)
 Jeena Marna Tere Sang (1992)
 Annayya (1993) as Nagamani, Kannada film
 Hum Hain Kamaal Ke (1993)
 Raja Babu (1994)
 Laadla (1994)
 Suhaag (1994)
 Bewafa Sanam (1995)
 Indian (1996)
 Chhote Sarkar (1996)
 Hameshaa (1997)
 Dil To Pagal Hai (1997)
 Saaz (1998)
 Saazish (1998)
 Kudrat (1998)
 Doli Saja Ke Rakhna (1998)
 Zulmi (1999)
 Haseena Maan Jaayegi (1999)
 Aarzoo (1999)
 Hum Tumhare Hain Sanam (2002)
 Khatta Meetha (2010)
 Bol Baby Bol (2014) Marathi film
 Mitwaa (2015)
 Chaal Jeevi Laiye! (2019, guest appearance, Gujarati)
 Ghudchadi (TBA)

Television shows

Awards and nominations 

Film

 Television

Notes

References

External links

 
 

Living people
Indian film actresses
Indian television actresses
Indian soap opera actresses
Filmfare Awards winners
Filmfare Lifetime Achievement Award winners
Actresses in Hindi cinema
Actresses in Gujarati cinema
Actresses in Hindi television
Actresses from Mumbai
Irani people
20th-century Indian actresses
21st-century Indian actresses
1946 births